Beatrice Macola (2 December 1965 – 13 December 2001) was an Italian actress.

Life and career 
Born in Verona into a noble family, after her accountancy studies Macola decided to pursue an acting career against the wishes of her father.

After several roles on stage she became first known for the Pupi Avati's 1986 variety show Hamburgher serenade that she hosted together with Nik Novecento. Her film roles include Claude Chabrol's Doctor M, Mario Monicelli's Dear Goddamned Friends and Steven Spielberg's Schindler's List, in which she played the role of Ingrid, the German lover of Oskar Schindler.

She died on December 13, 2001, at age 36, after 10 days in a coma following a cerebral infarction.

Filmography 
Mak P 100 (1988)
Sindrome veneziana (1989)
Doctor M (1990) as Anna
Das tätowierte Herz (1991)
Schindler's List (1993) as Ingrid
Lo sconosciuto (1993)
La primavera negli occhi (1994) as Betti
Dear Goddamned Friends (1994) as Testa di rapa
Corti stellari (1997) as (segment "Doom")
Buck and the Magic Bracelet (1998) as Isaia
La strategia della maschera (1999) as Adriane Lindner
La fame e la sete (1999) as Interpreter
Hostage (1999) as Eveline (final film role)

References

External links 

Actors from Verona
Italian stage actresses
Italian film actresses
Italian television actresses
1965 births
2001 deaths
20th-century Italian actresses